Diane Finley  (born October 3, 1957) is a former Canadian politician. From 2006 through 2015, she served in the cabinet of Prime Minister Stephen Harper.  Her ministerial portfolios included Minister of Human Resources and Skills Development, Minister of Public Works and Government Services, Minister Responsible for Canada Mortgage and Housing Corporation, or CMHC, and Minister of Citizenship and Immigration.  She was a member of the House of Commons of Canada, representing the riding of Haldimand—Norfolk for the Conservative Party from 2004 to 2021. In August 2020, she announced that she would not be running in the 2021 Canadian federal election. She resigned from office on May 11, 2021.

Personal life
Diane Finley was raised in Port Dover and Charlotteville in Norfolk County, Ontario, and has a Bachelor of Arts degree and a Masters in Business Administration from the University of Western Ontario.  After graduation, she became the administrator of Western's French Immersion School.  She then worked in a series of private and public sector jobs, in a variety of fields.  She was named "one of Canada's future leaders" by the Governor-General's Study Conference 2000. As a child, she participated in Girl Guides of Canada youth programs.

Her husband was Doug Finley, a Senator from Ontario and former campaign manager and director of political operations for the Conservative Party of Canada. The pair met while Diane was working as a summer hire at Rolls-Royce where Doug was an executive.

In 2006, Finley announced that she has Graves' disease, a non-life-threatening thyroid condition which causes increased sensitivity to bright lights and forces her to wear tinted glasses.

Political career

Long involved in politics of the Conservative Party and its predecessors, Finley first ran for public office in the 2004 federal election in the riding of Haldimand—Norfolk. She defeated Bob Speller, a Liberal cabinet minister, by 1,645 votes. After being re-elected in the 2006 election, she was appointed to the cabinet as Minister of Human Resources and Skills Development. An Order in Council transferred authority for Social Development Canada to her as well, and accordingly, she served under the style Minister of Human Resources and Social Development. She was shuffled from the Human Resources and Skills Development Canada to the Citizenship and Immigration Canada portfolio on January 4, 2007. The following year, Finley allegedly received threats from sex industry officials in relation to her support of Bill C-17, which sought to allow immigration officers to deny temporary visas to prospective strippers if they were suspected to be sex trafficking victims. Tim Lambrinos of the Adult Entertainment Association of Canada (AEAC) said that "it's not plausible" that any of the AEAC strip clubs were responsible for the threats.

Finley was re-elected in the 2008 election and resumed her former post as Minister of Human Resources and Skills Development. She was re-elected in the 2011 election with 50.9% of the vote in her riding. 

In March 2015, a parliamentary ethics report on an affair linked to disgraced prime ministerial aide Nigel Wright found that Finley had breached conflict of interest rules in her capacity as minister by diverting funding to a favoured project in Markham whose promoter had close ties to the Conservative Party.

After winning her seat once more in the 2015 federal election, Finley announced that she would be running for the position of interim leader of the Conservative Party, after Stephen Harper's resignation from the post. She was passed over for interim leader and subsequently placed in Rona Ambrose's shadow cabinet.

She was re-elected in the 2019 federal election. On August 23, 2020, she announced that she would not seek re-election in the 2021 federal election. She resigned from the House of Commons on May 11, 2021. Leslyn Lewis was the Conservative candidate elected to succeed Finley the 2021 federal election.

Political views

Finley has promoted increased private-sector involvement in health services. She was the founder of Canada's largest publicly funded ambulance service company, Canadian Medical Response, and has been active in the Canadian Council for Public-Private Partnerships.

Electoral record

References

External links
Official site

Hansard: Diane Finley's announcement of her Graves' disease diagnosis

1957 births
Women members of the House of Commons of Canada
Conservative Party of Canada MPs
Living people
Members of the 28th Canadian Ministry
Members of the House of Commons of Canada from Ontario
Members of the King's Privy Council for Canada
People from Norfolk County, Ontario
Politicians from Hamilton, Ontario
University of Western Ontario alumni
Women in Ontario politics
Women government ministers of Canada
21st-century Canadian women politicians